The Barro Branco tree frog (Boana secedens)  is a species of frog in the family Hylidae endemic to Brazil. Its natural habitats are subtropical or tropical moist lowland forests, rivers, freshwater marshes, and intermittent freshwater marshes.

Sources

Boana
Endemic fauna of Brazil
Amphibians described in 1963
Taxonomy articles created by Polbot